The Duncan Coffee Company is a coffee roasting and distributing company. While the company distributes brands under its own name, it also supplies coffee under other notable brands such as Shipley Do-Nuts and Bright and Early Coffee.

History
In 1901, J.W. O'Neal founded a coffee shop in Nashville, Tennessee. Along with the shop's co-founders, the shop convinced the owners of the historic Maxwell House Hotel to use their coffee, forming Maxwell House Coffee.

O'Neal's nephew, Herschel Duncan, developed the  blend for the Maryland Club, which became one of the better known brands of the time and formed the Duncan Coffee Company. Following the Duncan's death, the company was sold.  The company would immediately create the brands of Admiration Coffee and Bright and Early Coffee, which is still around today.

In 1957, United States Deputy Secretary of Defense and Secretary of Energy, Charles Duncan Jr., put together a group to buy back the company from the failing owners. The Coca-Cola Company would then acquire the growing company. The company would eventually be sold to Procter & Gamble. The company returned to family ownership when Herschel Mills Duncan IV bought the company.

Notable Brands

Bright and Early Coffee
Dilmah Tea (USA Only)
Shipley Do-Nuts

References

External links

Coffee companies of the United States
Coffee preparation
Nashville, Tennessee